Agra absurdis is a species of beetle in the family Carabidae. They are found in Brazil.

References 

Lebiinae
Beetles described in 1938